Head of a Traveller is a 1949 detective novel by Cecil Day-Lewis, written under the pen name of Nicholas Blake. It is the ninth in a series of novels featuring the private detective Nigel Strangeways.

Synopsis
When a headless corpse is found entangled in reeds on the River Thames close to the Oxfordshire home of celebrated poet Robert Seaton, Strangeways becomes involved in the case. Due to his admiration for Seaton he does everything he can to protect the family from the police investigation, but suspects the answer to the killing may lie in the great man's poetry.

References

Bibliography
 Bargainnier, Earl F. Twelve Englishmen of Mystery. Popular Press, 1984.
 Reilly, John M. Twentieth Century Crime & Mystery Writers. Springer, 2015.
 Stanford, Peter. C Day-Lewis: A Life. A&C Black, 2007.

1949 British novels
Novels by Cecil Day-Lewis
British crime novels
British thriller novels
Collins Crime Club books
British detective novels
Novels set in England